Mount Fraser is a mountain located on the border of Alberta and British Columbia. It is Alberta's 38th highest peak and Alberta's 22nd most prominent mountain. It is also British Columbia's 50th highest peak. It was named in 1917 after Simon Fraser.

The massif consists of three peaks:

See also
 List of peaks on the British Columbia–Alberta border
 List of mountains in the Canadian Rockies

References

Three-thousanders of Alberta
Three-thousanders of British Columbia
Canadian Rockies
Mountains of Jasper National Park
Mount Robson Provincial Park